Gwatkin is a surname. Notable people with the surname include:

 Frank Ashton-Gwatkin (1889–1976), British diplomat
 Henry Melvill Gwatkin (18441916), British theologian and historian
 Norman Gwatkin (1899–1971), British officer and courtier
 Phil Gwatkin (active 195357), English footballer
 Robert Lovell Gwatkin (1757–1843), High Sheriff of Cornwall
 Thomas Gwatkin (1741–1800), English cleric and academic
 Willoughby Garnons Gwatkin (18591925), British general who served with the Canadian army during World War 1

Fictional people 
 Daniel Gwatkin, in the song "The Unfortunate Gwatkin" on the 2014 album Urge for Offal by the band Half Man Half Biscuit
 Rowland Gwatkin, in The Valley of Bones and The Military Philosophers in the novel sequence A Dance to the Music of Time by Anthony Powell

See also 
 Watkin
 Watkins (disambiguation)
 Watkinson
 

English-language surnames